The 1954 United States Senate election in Colorado took place on November 2, 1954. Incumbent Democratic Senator Edwin C. Johnson did not run for re-election, instead he gave up his seat to run for Governor again. Republican Lieutenant Governor Gordon Allott defeated Democratic U.S. Representative John A. Carroll in the race for the open seat.

Democratic primary

Candidates
John A. Carroll, former U.S. Representative from Denver
J. Quigg Newton, Mayor of Denver

Results

General election

Results

See also 
 1954 United States Senate elections

References 

1954
Colorado
United States Senate